This is a list of crewed and uncrewed flights of Soyuz series spacecraft.

The Soyuz programme is an ongoing human spaceflight programme which was initiated by the Soviet Union in the early 1960s, originally part of a Moon landing project intended to put a Soviet cosmonaut on the Moon. It is the third Soviet human spaceflight programme after the Vostok and Voskhod programmes. Since the 1990s, as the successor state to the Soviet Union, Russia has continued and expanded the programme, which became part of a multinational collaboration to ensure a permanent human presence in low Earth orbit on the International Space Station (ISS). Soyuz spacecraft previously visited the Salyut and Mir space stations. Between the retirement of the Space Shuttle in 2011 and the first orbital flight of SpaceX's Crew Dragon in 2019, Soyuz were the only human-rated orbital spacecraft in operation, and the only way to transport crews to the ISS. Russia plans to succeed Soyuz in the 2020s with the Federatsiya/Orel programme, using new reusable capsules launching on Angara rockets, to transport cosmonauts to orbit and to a space station around the Moon.

Crewed mission numbers and spacecraft generations 
Beginning in 1966, the Soyuz programme has sent humans into space on a regular basis for over fifty years. Due to its length, the program has a complex history, which may lead to confusion about its mission numbers. The mission numbering scheme for crewed Soyuz flights is closely related to the generations of spacecraft. Understanding the former is made significantly easier by understanding the latter.

The first era of the Soyuz programme's crewed missions (Soyuz 1-40) used the 7K series of Soyuz craft, which included the first-generation (1.0) Soyuz 7K-OK, a variant (1.5) Soyuz 7K-OKS, the second-generation (2.0) Soyuz 7K-T, and the (2.5) Soyuz 7K-TM variant. Following this first era, successive eras of crewed missions have had mission numbers which were directly tied to the names of craft used:

 The second era of Soyuz T flights used the third-generation (3.0) craft of the same name. Mission numbers were of the form: "Soyuz T-#".
 The third era of Soyuz TM flights used the fourth-generation (4.0) craft of the same name. Mission numbers were of the form: "Soyuz TM-#".
 The fourth era of Soyuz TMA flights used the fifth-generation (5.0) craft of the same name. Mission numbers were of the form: "Soyuz TMA-#".
 The fifth era of Soyuz TMA-M flights used the fifth-generation variant (5.5) craft of the same name. Mission numbers were of the form "Soyuz TMA-##M".
 The sixth and current era of Soyuz MS flights uses the sixth-generation (6.0) craft of the same name. Mission numbers are of the form: "Soyuz MS-##".

Within each given era, a mission number generally reflects the mission's chronological launch order, e.g. Soyuz TMA-12M was the twelfth mission of the TMA-M era, immediately preceded by Soyuz TMA-11M and immediately followed by Soyuz TMA-13M.  Although there are exceptions to this (detailed below in the first table), the mission numbering scheme is usually consistent with chronological launch orders.  This is in contrast with the mission numbers of the Space Shuttle program, which were tied to specific mission objectives and did not reflect chronological launch orders, e.g. STS-50, the forty-eighth Shuttle mission, was immediately followed by STS-46, the forty-ninth Shuttle mission.

Soyuz 7K (1966-1981) 
The first Soyuz series was the 7K series.

Soyuz 7K-L1 

Spacecraft designed for Soviet human circumlunar missions. Missions are included under the Zond programme.

Soyuz 7K-LOK 

Spacecraft designed for Soviet human lunar orbital and landing missions.

Soyuz T (1979-1986)

Soyuz TM (1987-2002)

Soyuz TMA (2002-2012)

Soyuz TMA-M (2010-2016)

Soyuz MS (2016-)

See also 

 List of Space Shuttle missions
 Progress (spacecraft)
 Soyuz programme
 Soyuz (spacecraft)

Notes

References

Footnotes 

Soyuz program
Salyut program

International Space Station
Soyuz
Soyuz